Battah or Batta is a village in eastern Libya, almost  northeast of Al Marj.
During the Italian occupation it was named Oberdan, after the Italian nationalist Guglielmo Oberdan.

References

Populated places in Marj District
Cyrenaica